Oddz and Enz is a 1992 album by Split Enz. Composed mainly of live recordings during the Mental Notes period, the album also contains two non-album singles, a b-side and a demo recording.

Track listing
 "129 (Matinee Idyll)" (Phil Judd, Tim Finn) - "Live" Ormond Hall Reefer Cabaret, Melbourne December 30, 1975 - 3:50
 "Another Great Divide" (Judd, Finn, Eddie Rayner & Robert Gillies) - Single, January 1977 - 3:36
 "Lovey Dovey" (Judd, Finn) - "Live" Ormond Hall Reefer Cabaret, Melbourne December 30, 1975 - 3:37
 "Things" (Neil Finn) - Single, October 1979 - 2:39
 "Amy (Darling)" (Judd, Finn) - "Live" Ormond Hall Reefer Cabaret Melbourne December 30, 1975 - 5:09
 "Jolted" (Tim Finn) - Demo, Harlequin Studios New Zealand 1978 - 2:35 
 "Under the Wheel" (Judd, Finn) - "Live" Ormond Hall Reefer Cabaret, Melbourne December 30, 1975 - 7:26
 "Two of a Kind" (Tim Finn) - Recorded at Harlequin Studios, Auckland, June 1979, B-Side of "Next Exit" single, March 1983 - 3:40
 "True Colours (Let's Rock)" (Judd) - "Live" Auckland New Zealand 1976 - 5:57
 "Nightmare Stampede" (Judd) - "Live" Auckland New Zealand 1976 - 14:39

References

1992 compilation albums
Split Enz compilation albums
1992 live albums
Split Enz live albums
Mushroom Records live albums